Barbara Jonak, née Kurzaj (born 26 December 1975), is a Polish film, theatre and television actress.

Life and career
She was born on 26 December 1975 in Kraków. In 1994, she made her debut by performing in Elias Canetti's play The Wedding staged in the Juliusz Słowacki Theatre in Kraków. In 1999, she graduated from the National Academy of Theatre Arts in Kraków. Apart from the Juliusz Słowacki Theatre, she also performed at Kraków's Old Theatre and the Silesian Theatre in Katowice.

In 2005, she was awarded the Leon Schiller Prize by the Polish Union of Stage Actors (ZASP) for her performances in Nondum and Merylin Mongoł stage plays. In 2007, she appeared in Agnieszka Holland's political drama TV series Ekipa.

Her notable film roles are featured in Kinga Dębska's 2015 comedy film These Daughters of Mine and Jan Komasa's 2019 drama film Corpus Christi.

Appearances in film and television
1999: Tydzień z życia mężczyzny – killer
2000: Enduro Bojz – Ewa
2000–2001: Miasteczko – Ela's colleague
2001: Samo niebo – actress (episode 3)
2001: Inferno – Anka
2002: Wolny przejazd – Natasza
2003: Bez końca – girl
2004: W dół kolorowym wzgórzem – Zośka
2004: Ono – Ewa's friend
2004: Oficer – "doliniara" (episodes 7 and 10)
2005: Boża podszewka (episode 14)
2005: Oda do radości – Danka (part 1)
2006: Strajk – Elwira
2006: Królowie śródmieścia – Bożena's secretary (episodes 5-7)
2006: Na cz@tach – Monika
2006: Co słonko widziało – Ewa
2007: Katyń
2007: Ekipa – Patrycja
2008: Wichry Kołymy – prisoner
2008–2011: Ojciec Mateusz – Teresa (episode 1); SPA worker (episode 31); pathomorphologist (episode 93)
2008: Glina – Helena Kuchciak (episode 20)
2009: Generał – neighbour (episode 2)
2009: Generał – zamach na Gibraltarze – Ala
2009–2010: Blondynka – Viola
2010: Ratownicy – Julita Kędzior (episode 2)
2010: Milczenie jest złotem – Marysia
2010: Maraton tańca – sister Cezaria
since 2010: Barwy szczęścia – Sabina Nowak-Tomala
2011: Ki – Iwo
2011–2013: Głęboka woda – Edyta Zając
2012: Paradoks – Grażyna (episode 4)
2013: Komisarz Alex – Markowska, Kaja's mother (episode 51)
2013: Stacja Warszawa – prosecutor
2015: These Daughters of Mine – Iza Kwiecień
2015: Czerwony pająk – prostitute
2016: Ojciec Mateusz – Gabriela Frączek (episode 192)
2016: Na dobre i na złe – Maja (episode 657)
2016: Bóg w Krakowie – Irena, Ola's boss
2017: Komisarz Alex – Natalia Rogalska (episode 116)
2018: Za marzenia – headmistress
2018: Dzień czekolady – Dawid's mother
2019: Szóstka – Teresa
2019: ''Corpus Christi – widow

See also
Polish cinema
Polish Film Awards

References

1975 births
Living people
Polish film actresses
Actresses from Kraków
Polish television actresses
Polish stage actresses
20th-century Polish actresses
21st-century Polish actresses